I'm Movin' On is an album by American jazz organist Jimmy Smith featuring performances recorded in 1963, but not released on the Blue Note label until 1967. It was rereleased on CD with two bonus tracks from the same session.

Reception
The Allmusic review by Scott Yanow awarded the album 3 stars stating:

Track listing

 "I'm Movin' On" (Hank Snow) – 5:17
 "Hotel Happiness" (Earl Shuman, Leon Carr) – 2:56
 "Cherry" (Ray Gilbert, Don Redman) – 3:58
 "'Tain't No Use" (Burton Lane, Herbert Magidson) – 6:08
 "Back Talk" (Jimmy Smith) – 11:06
 "What Kind of Fool Am I?" (Leslie Bricusse, Anthony Newley) – 7:33

Bonus tracks on 1995 CD reissue
  "Organic Greenery" (Smith) – 7:26 
 "Day In, Day Out" (Rube Bloom, Johnny Mercer) – 6:43

Personnel

Musicians
 Jimmy Smith – organ
 Grant Green – guitar (tracks 1-5, 7-8)
 Donald Bailey – drums (tracks 1-5, 7-8)

Technical
 Alfred Lion – producer
 Rudy Van Gelder – engineer
 Reid Miles – cover design, photography
 Ira Gitler – liner notes

References

Blue Note Records albums
Jimmy Smith (musician) albums
1967 albums
Albums recorded at Van Gelder Studio
Albums produced by Alfred Lion